Sudama Prasad is an Indian politician and member of the Bihar Legislative Assembly. He was elected as the representative of the Tarari constituency in 2015. Prasad is a member of principal state committee of the Communist Party of India (Marxist–Leninist) Liberation.

Political career 
Prasad was active in the Bhojpur district of Bihar from 1997 onwards, belonging to the category of Other Backward Class (OBC). He later became a member of the Communist Party of India (Marxist–Leninist) Liberation and was elected to its state committee. He was also accused in the murder case of an upper caste landlord which went to the Supreme Court of India. The court, however, acquitted him, ruling that he was victimised by the accusation and that the witnesses had given false testimonies to the court.

In the 2015 Bihar Legislative Assembly election, the Communist Party of India (Marxist–Leninist) Liberation fielded him as the candidate for the Tarari constituency and he was subsequently elected to the Bihar Legislative Assembly. The victory was seen as a regaining of a traditional stronghold of the party that had come under the domination of landlord backed candidates. He later supported the successful campaign of the Dalit activist and independent candidate Jignesh Mevani for the Vadgam assembly constituency in 2017 Gujarat Legislative Assembly election. 

As a member of the legislative assembly, Prasad has participated in several agitations and highlighted concerns on issues such as demands for adequate prices of makka (Maize), the Dalit Asmita Yatra called in the aftermath of the 2016 Una flogging incident, and mob lynchings in the state. Following the 2019 Bihar floods, he visited flood-hit areas in his constituency and organised new housing for villagers in flooded areas. Prasad participated in organising rescue operations with party workers between 18–24 July. According to him, the Nitish Kumar government had not initiated adequate measures for relief and rescue.

References 

People from Bihar
Bihar MLAs 2015–2020
Communist Party of India (Marxist–Leninist) Liberation politicians
Year of birth missing (living people)
Living people
Bihar MLAs 2020–2025